The Lasker-Bloomberg Public Service Award, known until 2009 as the Mary Woodard Lasker Public Service Award, is awarded by the Lasker Foundation to honor an individual or organization whose public service has profoundly enlarged the possibilities for medical research and the health sciences and their impact on the health of the public. The award, worth $250,000, is presented in odd-numbered years to a winner selected from among policy makers, journalists, philanthropists, advocates, scientists, and public health professionals.  It is named after the philanthropists Albert Lasker and Michael R. Bloomberg.

Initially known as the Albert Lasker Public Service Award, it was known from 2000-09 as the Mary Woodard Lasker Public Service Award in honour of his wife.

Winners
Source: 
2022   Lauren Gardner
2019   Gavi, the Vaccine Alliance
2017   Planned Parenthood
2015   Médecins Sans Frontières
2013   Bill Gates and Melinda Gates
2011   The Clinical Center of the National Institutes of Health
2009   Michael Bloomberg
2007   Anthony Fauci
2005   Nancy Brinker
2003  	Christopher Reeve
2001 	William Foege
2000 	Betty Ford, Harold P. Freeman, David J. Mahoney, The Science Times of The New York Times and John Edward Porter
1995  	Mark O. Hatfield
1993 	Paul G. Rogers and Nancy Wexler
1991 	Robin Chandler Duke and Thomas P. O'Neill, Jr.
1989 	Lewis Thomas
1988 	Lowell P. Weicker, Jr.
1986 	Ma Haide (George Hatem)
1985 	Lane W. Adams and Ann Landers (Eppie Lederer)
1984 	Henry J. Heimlich
1983 	Maurice R. Hilleman and Saul Krugman
1979 	John Foster Wilson
1978 	Elliot L. Richardson and Theodore Cooper
1976 	World Health Organization
1975 	Jules C. Stein
1973 	Warren Magnuson
1968 	Lister Hill
1967 	Claude Pepper
1966 	Eunice Kennedy Shriver
1965 	Lyndon Baines Johnson
1963 	Melvin R. Laird and Oren Harris
1960 	John B. Grant and Abel Wolman
1959 	Maurice Pate
1958 	Basil O'Connor
1957 	Frank G. Boudreau, C.J. Van Slyke and Reginald M. Atwater
1956 	William P. Shepard
1955 	Robert D. Defries, The Menninger Foundation, Nursing Services of the U.S. Public Health Service, Pearl McIver and Margaret G. Arnstein
1954 	Leona Baumgartner
1953 	Felix J. Underwood and Earle B. Phelps
1952 	G. Brock Chisholm and Howard A. Rusk
1951 	Florence R. Sabin
1950 	Eugene Lindsay Bishop
1949 	Marion W. Sheahan
1948 	R.E. Dyer and Martha M. Eliot
1947 	Alice Hamilton
1946 	Alfred Newton Richards and Fred L. Soper

See also
 List of medicine awards

References

External links
 - Official Site

Humanitarian and service awards
Lasker Award